Annie Genevard (née Tharin, 7 September 1956) is a French politician who has represented the 5th constituency of the Doubs department in the National Assembly since 2012. She served as secretary-general of The Republicans (LR) from 2017 to 2019 under successive party leaders Laurent Wauquiez and Christian Jacob. From 4 July 2022 until 11 December 2022, she was the ad interim party leader following the resignation of Jacob, in her role as first party vice president (French: vice-présidente déléguée), which she has held since 6 July 2021.

A teacher by occupation, Genevard was Mayor of Morteau from 2002 until 2017.

Family
A native of Audincourt, Genevard is the daughter of Irène Tharin, who served in the National Assembly from 2002 to 2007, representing the fourth constituency of Doubs as a member of the Union for a Popular Movement, which would be renamed The Republicans in 2015. She also was Mayor of Seloncourt from 1993 until 2015.

Political career

Genevard has been a member of the National Assembly since the 2012 legislative election, when she succeeded Jean-Marie Binetruy, whom she also succeeded as Mayor of Morteau when he entered the National Assembly. She has since been one of the chamber's six vice presidents under the leadership of François de Rugy (2017–2018) and Richard Ferrand (since 2018). She also serves von the Committee on Cultural Affairs and Education. In addition to her committee assignments, she is a member of the study group on the Holy See.

In the 2016 The Republicans primary ahead of the 2017 presidential election, Genevard endorsed François Fillon as the party's candidate for President of France. 

In the party’s 2017 leadership election, Genevard endorsed Laurent Wauquiez as party president. Following his election, she was appointed as the party's secretary-general. She left the position in 2019, as newly-elected party president Christian Jacob appointed Aurélien Pradié to succeed her.

At the Republicans’ national convention in December 2021, Genevard was part of the 11-member committee which oversaw the party’s selection of its candidate for the 2022 presidential elections.

See also
 2017 French legislative election

References

1956 births
Living people
Deputies of the 14th National Assembly of the French Fifth Republic
Deputies of the 15th National Assembly of the French Fifth Republic
Rally for the Republic politicians
Union for a Popular Movement politicians
The Republicans (France) politicians
20th-century French women politicians
21st-century French women politicians
Politicians from Bourgogne-Franche-Comté
People from Doubs
Women members of the National Assembly (France)
Franche-Comté Regional Councillors
Mayors of places in Bourgogne-Franche-Comté
Deputies of the 16th National Assembly of the French Fifth Republic